Douglas Vaz (died 9 November 2019) was a Jamaican politician.

Vaz was a member of the Jamaica Labour Party, which he represented throughout his political career. He was first elected to the Parliament of Jamaica in 1976, from the North Central St Andrew constituency. Vaz switched districts in 1989, to the North East St Andrew constituency, vacating North Central St Andrew for Karl Samuda. Vaz lost his seat in North East St Andrew to Karlene Kirlew-Robertson in 1993. Between 1980 and 1989, Vaz served in the Cabinet of Jamaica formed by prime minister Edward Seaga, as the minister of industry and commerce. 

Vaz married Sonia in 1959. The couple divorced in 1984. Their son, Daryl Vaz, is also a politician. Douglas Vaz died in his sleep on 9 November 2019, aged 83.

References

1930s births
2019 deaths
Government ministers of Jamaica
Members of the House of Representatives of Jamaica
Jamaica Labour Party politicians
Commerce and industry ministers
People from Saint Andrew Parish, Jamaica
Jamaican people of Puerto Rican descent